Meghna Jayanth is a video game writer and narrative designer. She is known for her writing on 80 Days and Sunless Sea. Jayanth worked at the BBC before becoming a freelance writer, and has also written for The Guardian on women and video games.

Early life 
While growing up Jayanth lived in Bangalore, London, and Saudi Arabia, attending a total of 12 different schools. Her first gaming experiences included Disney's Aladdin, SimTower, and Civilization II. Jayanth studied English literature at the University of Oxford, where she directed The Oxford Revue, following which she worked at the BBC in the department responsible for commissioning video games.

Jayanth first became interested in writing for video games via online text-based roleplaying games in which she built worlds and characters. The first playable game she wrote was Samsara, a choice-based narrative game set in Bengal in 1757, which she has yet to finish. Jayanth is particularly interested in writing stories which explore "unexpected perspectives and unheard voices", including under-represented people and cultures.

Career 

Jayanth was the writer of 80 Days, for which she wrote a total of more than 750,000 words, contributed to the writing for Horizon Zero Dawn, and was a writer for Sunless Sea. In addition to other accolades, 80 Days was nominated for a BAFTA Game Award for Story in 2014, and Meg won the UK Writers' Guild Award for Best Writing in a Video Game.

In 2019 Jayanth hosted the Independent Games Festival awards, where she used her opening speech to encourage the video game industry to reject hatred and create a welcoming and safe environment. In May of that year, she announced the formation of a "boutique narrative label" called Red Queens alongside Leigh Alexander. 

 Jayanth was working on Boyfriend Dungeon and Sable.

References

External links 

The Guardian people
Video game writers
Living people
Year of birth missing (living people)
People from Bangalore
People from London
British video game designers
21st-century Indian women writers
21st-century Indian writers
21st-century British women writers
21st-century Indian women artists
21st-century Indian artists
21st-century British women artists
British people of Indian descent
Women in the video game industry